Bruno Fornaciari (Sondrio, 17 October 1881 – Rome, 19 June 1959) was an Italian civil servant, who served as prefect of Trieste and Milan under the Fascist regime and briefly as Minister of the Interior of the Badoglio I Cabinet, the first after the fall of the regime.

Biography

He was born in Sondrio in 1881, and after obtaining a degree in law in 1903 he started his career at the Ministry of the Interior, holding offices in Pavia and Genoa. From 1909 he worked for the public health directorate, participating in the relief of the Calabria and Sicily earthquake of 1908, of the cholera epidemic of 1910-11 and of the 1915 Avezzano earthquake, being later awarded the Silver Medal for Public Health Merit.

In 1923 he was appointed Vice Prefect of Florence, and in May 1926 he joined the National Fascist Party, although he was considered a follower of Nitti rather than a true Fascist. On 6 December 1926, after two months as prefectural commissioner for the municipality of Genoa, he was appointed prefect of Trieste until July 1929, when he became director-general of public health services until March 1930. He was then prefect of Milan from 1930 to 1935, after which he was placed at the head of the general direction of the civil administration at the Ministry of the Interior.

After being placed on leave, he worked in the Italian Red Cross and in the organization for the assistance to disabled veterans. Following the fall of the Fascist regime on 25 July 1943, he was appointed Minister of the Interior of the Badoglio I Cabinet, overseeing the suppression of the National Fascist Party and the dissolution of the Grand Council of Fascism, the Chamber of Fasces and Corporations and the Special Tribunal for the Defense of the State, as well as the extension of the state of war and martial law to the entire Italian territory. On 9 August 1943 he was replaced by Umberto Ricci. In 1948 he was nominated to the Council of State and later judge at the Supreme Military Tribunal until 1951, when he was retired. He died in 1959.

References

1881 births
1959 deaths
Government ministers of Italy
Italian Ministers of the Interior
Italian prefects

it:Bruno Fornaciari
de:Bruno Fornaciari